Sharpness is a port in Gloucestershire, England.

Sharpness may also refer to:

 Sharpness (visual), a combination of resolution and acutance
 Critical focus or critical sharpness, the area of maximal optical resolution
 Sharpness of vision, or visual acuity

See also

Sharp (disambiguation)
Sharpening, the creation of sharpness of a cutting tool or similar